José Vieira (born 22 October 1932) is a Portuguese rower. He competed in the men's coxed four event at the 1960 Summer Olympics.

References

External links
 

1932 births
Living people
Portuguese male rowers
Olympic rowers of Portugal
Rowers at the 1960 Summer Olympics
People from Caminha
Sportspeople from Viana do Castelo District